This is a list of adult fiction books that topped The New York Times Fiction Best Seller list in 1939. When the list began in 1931 through 1941 it only reflected sales in the New York City area.

The two most popular books that year were The Grapes of Wrath, by John Steinbeck, which held on top of the list for 24 weeks, and All This and Heaven Too by Rachel Field, which was on top of the list for 14 weeks.

See also

 1939 in literature
 Lists of The New York Times Fiction Best Sellers
 Publishers Weekly list of bestselling novels in the United States in the 1930s

References

1939
.
1939 in the United States